The LSWR X2 class was a class of express passenger 4-4-0 steam locomotives designed for the London and South Western Railway by William Adams. Twenty were constructed at Nine Elms Locomotive Works between 1890 and 1892.

The class were numbered 577–596, and were an enlarged version of the 460 class. Adams had designed his  drivered locomotives for the London to Bournemouth route, while the  drivered locomotives were intended for the London to Salisbury route which had more severe gradients.

All passed to the Southern Railway at the grouping in 1923. Withdrawals started in 1930, and by the end of 1933, only four remained. No. 592 went in 1936, numbers 587 and 590 were retired during 1937, leaving only No. 586, which was withdrawn in November 1942. All were scrapped.

References 

X02
4-4-0 locomotives
Railway locomotives introduced in 1890
Scrapped locomotives
Standard gauge steam locomotives of Great Britain